Tamish may refer to the following:
TAMISH (Bates) is an artist, songwriter, and producer in the United States.  She released her debut single, MET YOU in 2015, and corresponding music video on YouTube in 2016.
Tamish, Georgia - A town in the Abkhazia region of Georgia
Tamish River - A river in Serbia